The 1975 Masters Tournament was the 39th Masters Tournament, held April 10–13 at Augusta National Golf Club in Augusta, Georgia.

Jack Nicklaus won his fifth Masters and thirteenth major title, one stroke ahead of runners-up Johnny Miller and  At age 40, Lee Elder became the first African-American to compete at the tournament, but missed the cut by four strokes.

The 1975 Masters is widely considered to be one of the greatest majors ever, with three great players at the peak of their games dueling in a thrilling Sunday finish.

Had a playoff been required, it would have been a full 18-hole round on Monday. Prior to the next Masters in 1976, a sudden-death format was introduced and was first used in 1979.

Nicklaus won his sixth green jacket eleven years later in 1986 at age 46.

Course

Field
1. Masters champions
Tommy Aaron (12), George Archer, Gay Brewer (12), Billy Casper (12), Charles Coody, Doug Ford, Bob Goalby (8), Jack Nicklaus (2,3,4,8,9,10,11,12), Arnold Palmer (8,9,12), Gary Player (3,4,8,9,10,11), Sam Snead (8,10), Art Wall Jr.
Jack Burke Jr., Jimmy Demaret, Ralph Guldahl, Claude Harmon, Ben Hogan, Herman Keiser, Cary Middlecoff, Byron Nelson, Henry Picard, and Gene Sarazen did not play.

The following categories only apply to Americans

2. U.S. Open champions (last five years)
Hale Irwin (8,9), Johnny Miller (8,11), Lee Trevino (3,4,10,11,12)

3. The Open champions (last five years)
Tom Weiskopf (8,9,11,12)

4. PGA champions (last five years)
Dave Stockton (8,11)

5. 1974 U.S. Amateur semi-finalists
John Grace (a), Gary Koch (7,a), Jerry Pate (6,7,a), Curtis Strange (7,a)

6. Previous two U.S. Amateur and Amateur champions
Dick Siderowf (a), Craig Stadler (a)

7. Members of the 1974 U.S. Eisenhower Trophy team
George Burns (a)

8. Top 24 players and ties from the 1974 Masters Tournament
Buddy Allin (9,11), Miller Barber (11), Frank Beard (9), Jim Colbert (9,11), Ben Crenshaw, Raymond Floyd (9), Hubert Green (10,11), Jerry Heard, Dave Hill (10,11,12), Ralph Johnston, Bobby Nichols (11), Phil Rodgers, Chi-Chi Rodríguez (12), Dan Sikes

9. Top 16 players and ties from the 1974 U.S. Open
Forrest Fezler (11), Lou Graham (12), Tom Kite, John Mahaffey, Mike Reasor, Tom Watson (11), Bert Yancey, Larry Ziegler (11)

10. Top eight players and ties from 1974 PGA Championship
Al Geiberger (11)

11. Winners of PGA Tour events since the previous Masters
Rod Curl, Terry Diehl, Lee Elder, Pat Fitzsimons, Gary Groh, Richie Karl, Gene Littler, Mac McLendon, Bob Menne, Allen Miller, Bob Murphy, J. C. Snead (12), Ed Sneed

12. Members of the U.S. 1973 Ryder Cup team
Homero Blancas

13. Foreign invitations
Isao Aoki, Hugh Baiocchi, Maurice Bembridge (8), Bob Charles, Bobby Cole (10), Bruce Crampton (8), Roberto De Vicenzo, Bruce Devlin, Dale Hayes, Tony Jacklin (2), Lu Liang-Huan, Graham Marsh, Peter Oosterhuis, Masashi Ozaki, Victor Regalado (11)

Numbers in brackets indicate categories that the player would have qualified under had they been American.

Round summaries

First round
Thursday, April 10, 1975

(a) = amateur

Source:

Second round
Friday, April 11, 1975

Snead, age 62, was one-over-par after 27 holes when he withdrew due to a back injury.

Source:

Third round
Saturday, April 12, 1975

Nicklaus entered the weekend with a five-shot lead but struggled with a one-over 73 in the final pairing with Arnold Palmer. Weiskopf carded a 66 (–6) to take a one-stroke lead and Miller a 65 to climb into solo third. Nicklaus three-putted four times on Saturday and was three-over-par on the last four holes to lose the lead.
 

Source:

Final round
Sunday, April 13, 1975

Summary
Although Nicklaus was in solo second after 54 holes, he played with Tom Watson in the penultimate pairing, followed by Miller and leader Weiskopf. Nicklaus was three-under for the round and led Weiskopf by a stroke at the 14th tee, but he bogeyed while Weiskopf birdied for a two-shot swing and a lead change. On the par-3 16th hole, Nicklaus listened on the green as both Weiskopf and Miller birdied on the 15th green, as he had done. Nicklaus then sank a  birdie putt, while Weiskopf and Miller watched from the 16th tee.  Weiskopf left his tee shot  short and bogeyed, while Miller made par and birdied 17.

Both were a stroke behind with makeable birdie putts on the 72nd green to tie Nicklaus, who had just missed his  birdie attempt.  Miller missed left and low from  while Weiskopf's eight-footer (2.4 m) missed right.

Final leaderboard

Sources:

Scorecard

Cumulative tournament scores, relative to par
{|class="wikitable" span = 50 style="font-size:85%;
|-
|style="background: Red;" width=10|
|Eagle
|style="background: Pink;" width=10|
|Birdie
|style="background: PaleGreen;" width=10|
|Bogey
|style="background: Green;" width=10|
|Double bogey
|style="background: Olive;" width=10|
|Triple bogey+
|}
Source:

References

External links
Masters.com – past winners and results
Augusta.com – 1975 Masters leaderboard and scorecards

1975
1975 in golf
1975 in American sports
1975 in sports in Georgia (U.S. state)
April 1975 sports events in the United States